Count Adolf von Schwarzenberg (1547 – 29 July 1600) was a renowned general of the Holy Roman Empire whose sword, along with that of his descendant Prince Karl Philipp, is preserved in the arsenal of Vienna. He fought in the wars of religion, but was chiefly distinguished in the wars against the Turks on the eastern frontier. He was killed in a mutiny of the soldiers at Papa in Hungary in 1600.

His only son was Adam von Schwarzenberg (1583–1641), advisor of George William, Elector of Brandenburg during the Thirty Years' War.

See also
 House of Schwarzenberg

References

Attribution

Notes

Austrian generals
Counts of Austria
Adolf
1547 births
1600 deaths